Walter Robert Wilhelm Grotrian (21 April 1890 in Aachen; † 3 March 1954 in Potsdam) was a German astronomer and astrophysicist.

Grotrian studied the emission line from the solar corona in the green region of the spectrum; this emission line could not be attributed to any known chemical element and was thought to be a new element (which scientists named "coronium").  Grotrian and Bengt Edlén from Sweden demonstrated that the two observed emission lines arise from iron atoms that have lost about half their 26 electrons.

Named after Grotrian
The impact crater Grotrian on the Moon
The Grotrian diagram in atomic spectroscopy showing the allowed transitions between atomic energy levels
Character in "Time Keeps on Slippin'" episode of Futurama

References

20th-century German astronomers
1890 births
1954 deaths
Members of the German Academy of Sciences at Berlin